Van Mildert College (known colloquially as Mildert) is a college of Durham University in England. Founded in 1965, it takes its name from William Van Mildert, Prince-Bishop of Durham from 1826 to 1836 and a leading figure in the University's 1832 foundation. Originally an all-male college, it became co-educational in 1972 with the admission of female undergraduates.

The college occupies grounds of eight acres (32,000 m²) alongside South Road and is centred on a small lake. The college's accommodation and communal facilities are modern and spacious.

The principal of the college is Tom Mole, best-selling author and Professor of English Literature and Book History at Durham University.

History and buildings

Van Mildert College was established in 1965 following recommendations of the Robbins Report looking into the future of higher education in the UK.  In 1963, the University of Newcastle was officially established as a separate entity from the University of Durham, meaning new colleges were required to meet the new university places that the Government wished to create. As a result, the university planned to establish three new colleges on Elvet Hill and these went on to be named Collingwood College, Trevelyan College and Van Mildert College.

Women postgraduate students were first admitted in 1967, studying Certificates in Education. Female undergraduates were first admitted to the college in 1972.

The accommodation blocks are named Tyne, Tees, Middleton, Derwent, Wear, Tunstall and Deerness, the latter two of which are fully en suite. These are named after local rivers (River Tyne, River Tees, River Derwent, River Wear, River Deerness), a town (Tunstall) and an architect (Middleton). They are all situated within the college grounds, and the university is in the process of refurbishing each of the buildings in turn. In total the College can provide around 525 single rooms for its members.

Dining Hall
The college's Dining Hall, the Ann Dobson Dining Hall (colloquially the "Annie D"), is the largest student dining hall in the UK. It measures 30.8m by 13.2m and can seat approximately 350 members at Formal dinners.
The dining hall is used for a variety of functions over the academic year and plays a central role in the lives of livers in (students who live on the college site) as it is where college meals and formals are held. The hall also acts as a venue for drama productions, and as a sports hall.

A copy of a portrait of William Van Mildert, whom the college is named after, hangs at one end of Van Mildert dining hall, along with portraits of the former Principals and Masters of the College.

Library
The College library is well equipped with over 12,000 books & journals and, along with St John's College Archives, is the only other College library in Durham to be listed in The National Archives.

Bar and Junior Common Room
Van Mildert has a recently refurbished bar which is extensively used by members of the college, as well as by students from other colleges. It is also generally used for holding JCR meetings during term time. In recent years, the college bar has won the 'University Bar' category of the Best Bar None awards for Durham City for the 2008–09 and 2010–11 academic years. Most recently, Van Mildert Bar won the 'Gold' category for the Best Bar None Awards for the year 2016-17. 

The Bar is currently run by Sabbatical Bar Steward (Cellarman) Harrison Newsham.

The Junior Common Room is used for many of the social events that are organised by the JCR. For example, bops, entertainment after Formal dinners, band nights and amateur theatre productions. Both rooms have large plasma screen TVs which are used to show major sporting fixtures during the academic term.

Other facilities
The College has a host of other social facilities, including a music/recording suite with drums, grand piano and recording equipment. The College also has a gym, computer room, shop, tennis court and a full-size snooker table.

Arms

The college arms are blazoned as "Gules two Scythe blades in saltire in chief the Cross of St Cuthbert Argent And for the Crest On a Wreath of the Colours in front of a Castle of three Towers Sable a silver penannular brooch proper the ends charged with Gilded Crosses of St Cuthbert."  The scythes and the red field are taken from Bishop Van Mildert's episcopal arms; the cross of St Cuthbert is a common emblem of Durham City and University. The college generally uses only the shield of its arms for most purposes.

Student life

Common Rooms
All members of college are members of a common room.  Undergraduates are members of the Junior Common Room. The JCR elects an Executive Committee which ensures the successful running of the JCR, in conjunction with the College Officers. The governance procedure of the JCR is stated in the constitution, which can only be amended by resolution of the JCR members during general meetings. Undergraduates constitute the majority of the student population of the college, with approximately 1200 JCR members as of the 2021-2022 academic year. Until 2018 the Junior Common Room of Van Mildert College had a 236-page constitution, making it significantly longer than the Constitutions of most sovereign states.

Postgraduate students are members of the Middle Common Room (MCR), which hosts its own events and benefits from a refurbished Common Room and separate accommodation in Deerness block. All rooms in this block are en-suite and have access to kitchen facilities due to the fact that postgraduate students are often resident in college outside of normal term times. Postgraduate members of the college are entitled to make use of all the JCR facilities available. Academic and professional services staff of the University, alumni and friends of the college from the local community form the Senior Common Room (SCR).

Arts
The college has a number of groups involved in music, art, and the performing arts, collectively known as 'Van MildARTS'. The college hosts an annual arts week and annual musical, with recent productions being Cabaret, Our Country's Good, Guys and Dolls, Sweeney Todd: The Demon Barber of Fleet Street, Rent and Mama Mia! The college has a Big Band, Dance Society and Jam Society. This Society organises Jam by the Lake, the only open-air musical festival in County Durham and frequent winner of Purple Radio's 'Best Music Event' award.

Sports
The college has a strong sporting profile with a number of successful teams across a range of both traditional and non-traditional sports, including eight male football teams; two male rugby teams; a Women's Rugby team, Van Maidan's (joint with St Aidan's College); Cheerleading (with the College team having won the Inter-Collegiate Competition for five consecutive years); Ultimate Frisbee; Darts (most notably the Women's Darts "D Team"); and many more. Awards for graduating sports players are given at the Annual Sports Formal. This event celebrates the work and success of the sports teams, but more so the JCR Members who captain the teams and make up their Executive Committees.

Boat Club
Van Mildert Boat Club is the college rowing club. It was founded in 1965 by Simon Scott, an Engineering undergraduate at Durham University and one of the founding members of Van Mildert College.

The boathouse of the club is on the River Wear, opposite Dunelm House and below Kingsgate Bridge.

The club competes against other college clubs in intercollegiate competitions organised by Durham College Rowing. It also takes part in regional events and national events (such as Head of the River Race, Women's Eights Head of the River Race and BUCS Regatta).

The college boat house burnt down after an arsonist attacked it on 21 December 2021.

Outreach

One of the most notable aspects of Van Mildert's College is its passion for Community Outreach. Over recent years, six projects have been set up to provide support to a range of groups in the community. This includes visiting local young offenders (Secure Centre Mentoring Scheme), engaging with young children and teenagers (Primary School Project and Young Peoples' Project), visiting and building relationships with the local elderly community (Community Visiting Scheme); or working as respite carers for the families of young disabled children (Carers Respite Committee). The latest outreach project, Environmental Conservation Committee helps to raise the profile of sustainability by visiting rehabilitation centres, schools and recreational areas. These projects cumulatively raise over £15,000 each year to function. This is through a range of methods, but mainly through hosting large-scale College events such as Mildert Would I Lie To You? and Van Mildert Take Me Out.

Academic dress
At Van Mildert the undergraduate academic gown is not required to be worn to formal events nor at Matriculation, instead formal dress is used. In addition, students wear black tie attire at the end of term balls.

Formals
Formals take place regularly during the academic term, with the college holding between three and five per term. Students are not required to wear academic dress to formal dinners, instead formal dress is worn except when it is a Ball and dinner jackets are worn. At the end of the dining hall a High Table consisting of members of the SCR and their guests are present at every formal. The principal's entrance and exit, announced to attendees by the ringing of the election bell by the JCR President, signifies the official opening and closing of the formal meal. Food at a formal meal usually consists of three courses and is often followed by evening entertainment.

Van Mildert Dimensions 
The college has a student enrichment programme, known as the Dimensions Programme, which includes provision of a broad-ranging series of lectures, seminars and debates, along with skills-based activities such as networking sessions, employability initiatives and well-established work with the local community.

The programme is based on three themes: engage and inspire wellbeing and community, and find your future. Events in the 2021-2022 academic year included "Doing justice" with Lord Anthony Hughes and Sarah Bousfield; "Boris Johnson: has the magic gone and can Labour win?" with George Parker; "A Choral Conversation" with David Wakeham; and "Are We All Doomed? The unravelling of the international order" with Rt Hon Lord Robertson.

The Kazu

The Kazu is a traditional ceremony performed by the winning candidate after elections to the JCR Executive Committee, following the announcement of results by the JCR Chair. In more recent years, it has only been the elected President that performs a Kazu. A Kazu is a celebratory action which requires the winning candidate of every election to kick a full can of Coca-Cola down the stairs in the foyer, throw it over their head three times and then opening the can over their head. The JCR Standing Orders and website note that it "may be done wearing clothes" and that "Wikipedia knows more about Kazus than anyone in College".

The tradition was started by a Japanese exchange student called Kazuhisa who regularly performed the Kazu in the JCR foyer. The first official Kazu was performed by James Mackenzie in March 1997, upon being elected JCR President.

Associated institutions 

Following the tradition of Oxbridge Colleges being twinned with each other, as of 2012 Van Mildert College has been twinned with Halifax College, University of York.

People associated with Van Mildert

Principal 
Professor Tom Mole is the current Principal of the College. 

The following list is of the past Masters & Principals of the College:
 Arthur Prowse (1964–1972)
 Paul Kent (1972–1982)
 Arnold Bradshaw (1983–1988)
 Judy Turner (1989–1999)
 Ian Taylor (1999–2000)
 George Patterson (2000–2004)
 Patrick O'Meara (2004–2011)
 David Harper (2011–2021)
 Tom Mole (2021 to present)

Fellows 
The college has two fellowships for visiting scholars; the Arthur Prowse Fellowship, named after the College's first Master, and the Arnold Bradshaw Fellowship. The fellowships are typically awarded for one academic term in conjunction with the Institute of Advanced Study with the fellow residing in the College and becoming a member of the SCR. Recent fellows have included Adi Ophir and Mikhail Epstein.

Notable alumni

Van Mildert alumni are active through organisations and events, such as the Van Mildert Association, which cater for the more than 7,500 living alumni.

 George Alagiah – presenter: BBC TV News at Six since 2003
 Ven. Stuart Bain – BA Theol. (1977) – Archdeacon of Sunderland
 John D. Barrow – BSc Hons (1974) – Cosmologist, winner of the 2006 Templeton Prize and Fellow of the Royal Society, Professor of Mathematical Sciences, Department of Applied Mathematics and Theoretical Physics, University of Cambridge since 1999
 Jonathan Edwards – Olympic gold medal-winning and current World Record-holding triple jumper
 Jesse Honey – Winner of BBC Mastermind 2010 and World Quiz Champion 2012
 Anthony Hughes – BA (1969)- Lord Justice of Appeal in the Queen's Bench Division of the High Court of England and Wales
 Tony Johnstone-Burt – Vice Admiral, Chief of Staff to NATO's Supreme Allied Command Transformation
 Frank Kelly – BSc (1971) – Professor of the Mathematics of Systems, University of Cambridge since 1990; Master of Christ's College, Cambridge from 2006 to 2016
 John Douglas Maitland – BSc – Master of Lauderdale
 Baroness Morgan of Huyton – British Labour Party politician, former Minister of State for Women and board member of the Olympic Delivery Authority
 Sebastian Payne - British political journalist, currently Whitehall editor for the Financial Times 
 David Walton – Economist and member of the Bank of England's Monetary Policy Committee
 Rev. Martin Wharton – Lord Bishop of Newcastle
 John B. Williams – Electronic music producer and DJ

Gallery

References

 Bradshaw, A. (1990) Van Mildert College: The First 25 Years, A Sketch.

External links

 Van Mildert College official website
 Van Mildert on Collegiate Way
 Van Mildert College JCR student organisation
 Van Mildert MCR website
 Van Mildert Boat Club (VMBC)
 Van Mildert Association, Mildert's alumni association

 
Colleges of Durham University
Educational institutions established in 1965
1965 establishments in England